"Mayya" is a popular Hindi song from the 2007 Hindi  film Guru. It was composed by A. R. Rahman, performed by Maryem Toller, Chinmayee, Keerthi Sagathia and written by Gulzar. Apart from the film's soundtrack, it also appeared in the compilation album, A. R. Rahman – A World of Music released in 2009. The song was also released in Tamil and Telugu.

Development
Rahman personally trained Egyptian singer Maryem Tollar to sing "Mayya", a song which Rahman wrote while on Hajj in Makkah. After he heard a man near a river who was continually repeating "moya moya moya" (water in Arabic), he told Gulzar to incorporate the word into the tune he had created while touring in Toronto, Ontario, Canada. Mayya was the first song recorded for the film.

Reception
The song received excellent critical reviews, most of them hailing the international appeal of the song. A review on Planetbollywood said, "Mayya is an internationally intoxicating number. Credit must be given to Maryem Toller who brings her vocally rooted renditions to play with Rahman’s Egyptian influenced composition that is everything but controlled! Chinmayee picks up where she had left off earlier, oozing into the piece seamlessly. Keerthi’s invigorating vocal interludes match the power of the composition itself. Gulzar’s words are somewhat along the ‘Beedi’ lines, filled with passion and power. This is a prime example of how good a pan-global sound can make you feel!" The song, along with its entire soundtrack album has proved a success, staying at the number one spot thirteen weeks after its release.

Music video

The video was filmed as a seductive Turkish themed dance by Mallika Sherawat. This was after a long time that Mallika did such an exotic dance performance in a music video.

Cover version
The track Mayya was sampled by Serbian artist Jelena Karleuša in her 2008 album JK Revolution. The track "Mala" and its Teatro Mix were credited to Rahman.
Additionally, Mayya was performed and popularized by Saregamapa contestant Mauli Dave and has become her signature track.

See also
Guru (soundtrack)

References

2006 songs
2007 songs
Songs with music by A. R. Rahman
Indian songs
Songs with lyrics by Gulzar